Valeriy Morozov (born 21 September 1994) is a Russian professional rugby union player  for Bath and the Russian National Team. His position is loosehead prop. He has previously played for Sale Sharks and Worcester Warriors in the Premiership.

Background
Born in Moscow, Russia, from the age of 7 Valeriy was engaged in volleyball, fulfilled the standard of a candidate for the master of sports. At the age of 14,  he realized that he does not have a great sports future in volleyball, his height of 1.91 was not enough for professional career. Therefore, Valery moved to the rugby section.

Club career 
Started playing rugby in his hometown Zelenograd. Then he began to play for the local amateur club in the position Number 8. At the end of 2015, Valeriy signed a contract for 3 years with the professional club Enisei-STM. Changed position on the field and began to play prop. He won all possible titles in Russia. In December 2018, Valeriy signed a contract with the English club Sale Sharks. Thanks to the recommendations of Andrei Ostrikov and Vadim Cobilas. On 9 March 2019 Valery was named as Man of the Match as he scored in Sale's Premiership Rugby win over Leicester Tigers.

On 23 June 2021 Sale Sharks confirmed that he would be leaving the club at the end of the 2020–21 season. He returned to Russia to play at CSKA Rugby in Moscow.

Morozov returned to England later on that year with Bath Rugby announcing on the 29 December that he would be joining the club as cover for the injured Beno Obano until the end of the season.

He signed for Worcester Warriors for the 2022–23 season but returned to Bath on 3 October 2022 as short-term injury cover. Worcester Warriors entered administration and all players' contracts were subsequently terminated on 5 October 2022.

International career 
Valeriy's debut for the Russian national team was on 11 November 2016 in Hong Kong against Zimbabwe, where he helped the Russian "Bears" win the 2016 Cup of Nations.  His debut try was in the match against Romania in the 2017 Rugby Europe Championship.

International tries

Honours

 Russian Championships (3): 2016, 2017, 2018
 Russian Cup (2): 2016, 2017
 Russian Supercup (1): 2017
 European Rugby Continental Shield (2): 2016–17, 2017–18
 Premiership Rugby Cup: 2019–20.
 Cup of Nations (2): 2016, 2017
 World Rugby Nations Cup runner-up (1): 2017
 Rugby Europe International Championships runner-up (1): 2018

References

1. http://www.itsrugby.fr/joueur-39236.html

2. http://www.trk7.ru/news/58094.html

Living people
1994 births
Sportspeople from Moscow
Russia international rugby union players
Sale Sharks players
Russian expatriate rugby union players
Expatriate rugby union players in England
Russian expatriate sportspeople in England
Rugby union props
Bath Rugby players
People from Zelenograd